Ernst Kudrass (17 September 1924 – 24 December 2019) was a German footballer. He played club football with Eintracht Frankfurt. 

Kudrass played in for his Silesian homeclub SV Manfred von Richthofen Schweidnitz and later DSV Schweidnitz. During World War II he was stationed with the Kriegsmarine in the Mediterranean Sea. He was captured by the British in Trieste and sent to Egypt. After his release he joined Eintracht Frankfurt in 1948.

Firstly deployed as a right midfielder he formed the Eintracht defence couple with Adolf Bechtold. 

Arguably his sportive highlights were winning the Oberliga Süd in 1953 and participating in the championship round in 1954. When Eintracht won the Oberliga Süd in 1959 and eventually won the German championship he was officially a squad member but after suffering a leg fracture in 1956 he only regularly played in the reserves team.

The trained plumber took care of coach duties in the reserves team and led the Amateurs to the Gruppenliga, the tier below the Hessenliga. In 1966 he moved with his family to Urberach and trained local side Viktoria Urberach. 

In this late life Ernst Kudrass remained a regular visitor of the first team and Eintracht reserves and regularly attended Eintracht museum events.

Honours 
 Oberliga Süd: 1952–53; runners-up 1953–54

Sources

External links
 Ernst Kudrass at eintracht-archiv.de
 Eintracht News at eintracht.de

1924 births
2019 deaths
German footballers
Eintracht Frankfurt players
People from Silesian Voivodeship
Association football defenders
German prisoners of war in World War II held by the United Kingdom
Kriegsmarine personnel of World War II